Owen (postcode 5460) is a rural community in the heart of the Adelaide Plains. It is about 80 km north of Adelaide in South Australia and is approximately 40 minutes by road to the nearest main regional centre of Gawler. It is in the Wakefield Regional Council.

Establishment
Owen was gazetted as a town on 1 May 1879 in conjunction with the construction of the Balaklava railway line between Hamley Bridge and Balaklava. The small village by this station is now considered to be part of Owen. At the 2016 census, Owen had a population of 261 in the town and 511 including the surrounding farmland.

The railway station at Stockyard Creek was originally larger than the one at Owen, as Stockyard Creek station was closer to the older town of Alma. However the railway did not go through Alma, and gradually the commercial centre in the area moved from Alma to Owen.

Overview 

Owen has a community Church, post office, bowling club, Country Fire Service (CFS) station, primary school, public swimming pool, hotel, children's playground and a golf course. In its heyday in the 1950s, Owen also had a bank, police station, drapery and a butcher.

The countryside surrounding Owen was once largely given over to sheep and cattle grazing. However, since the early 1990s the area has become better known for cropping (wheat, barley, canola, beans and, more recently, olives). The Adelaide-Balaklava broad-gauge railway line passed through Owen and the railway yard is marked by concrete grain silos typical of this region.

The drift to country living and the expanding Adelaide city environs has seen a number of young families moving into the town. New homes are being established at the rate of 1–2 per year – a veritable building boom given the almost 40 years in which only a handful of homes were built in the town. In 1997, the primary school had only 35 pupils. By 2005, this number had risen to over 50, a sure sign of a stable future. Owen's hosts annual small-horse carriage driving championships which are held on the town's oval around Easter time.

Media 
Owen's local newspaper is the Plains Producer, founded in 1903 and published in Balaklava.

Owen was also home to the short-lived Owen's Weekly and Dalkey District Courier (3 October – 21 November 1908), which was printed in parallel with the Hamley Bridge Express (3-31 October 1908) by T.W. Broadway. Each was printed in their respective town, and with different mastheads but the same content.

Gallery

Notable people
 Steele Hall, a former premier of South Australia and then federal politician came from Owen.
 Pru Goward, long-serving Australian Federal Government Commissioner for Sex Discrimination, came from Owen.

Notes and references

Towns in South Australia